Wawrzyniec, also known as Lawrence, was a medieval Bishop of Wrocław, Poland in the years 1207–1232.

According to Jan Długosz, a papal bull of Pope Innocent III required the Polish Princes not to interfere with the election of bishops. Polish bishops, led by Archbishop Henryk Kietlicz then advocated for Lawrence.

As bishop he established a number of churches and monasteries in the diocese.

Lawrence died 7 June 1232 and was interred in Lubiąż.

References

 

1232 deaths
Bishops of Wrocław
Year of birth unknown